The 6x4, 8-ton YaG-10 truck was produced from 1932 to 1940 by the Yaroslavl Motor Plant. 333 trucks were made, 61 of which were converted into 76.2mm anti-aircraft trucks. It was powered by a Hercules-YXC engine, originally from the United States but later copied, and 4-speed Brown-Lipe-554 gearbox, also later copied and produced domestically. The suspension was based on trucks made by the Moreland Truck Company. While capable of carrying 8 tons on paved surfaces, it was limited to 5 tons offroad. It had a maximum speed of 42 km/h and fuel consumption of 60 liters per 100 km.

References

Military trucks of the Soviet Union
Military vehicles introduced in the 1930s
World War II military vehicles
Vehicles introduced in 1932